Vitaphone Pictorial Revue (sometimes spelled “Review”) was a series of 9-11 minute newsreel oriented (documentary) film shorts produced by Vitaphone and Warner Brothers.

Overview

Mostly edited in New York at the Vitaphone studio, but a few also made in California with Gordon Hollingshead producing, these were human-interest newsreels that resembled such rival series like “Pathé Audio Review”, distributed by RKO Pictures, and Paramount Pictures “Paramount Pictorial”. Each film is divided into three or four separate segments. In a couple, a segment was presented in Cinecolor.

The series lasted just two years in the 1930s and was mostly forgotten until Turner Classic Movies started showing a few as filler between feature presentations, sometimes with the color segments missing.

Listing of films

See also
List of short subjects by Hollywood studio#Warner Brothers

References
  (features Vitaphone numbers and brief descriptions)
 Motion Pictures 1912-1939 Catalog of Copyright Entries 1951 Library of Congress 
BoxOffice back issue scans (release date and topic information reprinted in multiple issues)
Complete Index To World Film listing

Vitaphone short films
Warner Bros. short films
Documentary film series